The Red Locusts is an American supergroup consisting of Rick Springfield, Matt Bissonette, Greg Bissonette and two others. The band released an eponymous album, The Red Locusts, in March 2021.The album is a tribute to The Beatles and power pop bands of the 1980s and 1990s.

Band members 
There has been secrecy around the identity of the band members, with the album cover using pseudonyms, similar to the Traveling Wilburys:

 Paul Ramone (guitar, vocals), identified as Rick Springfield. The name Paul Ramone is a nod to Paul Ramon, an early pseudonym of Paul McCartney.
 Scotty Skuffleton (bass, vocals), identified as Matt Bissonette
 Skippy Skuffleton (drums, vocals), identified as Gregg Bissonette, Matt's brother
 Duncan Sweets (keyboards, vocals)
 Beau Weevil (guitar, vocals)

Album 

The Red Locusts is full of melodies, key changes and chiming guitars reminiscent of The Beatles. Springfield said "we wanted to do an album that was influenced but would send us to Beatle jail basically".

The song "Miss Daisy Hawkins" is based on the original working title of "Eleanor Rigby". It includes many allusions to Beatles songs, and notes how Hawkins was "lost to a whim way back in '66".

Track listing 

 "Under the Rainbow"
 "Another Bad Day for Cupid"
 "Sons and Daughters"
 "Miss Daisy Hawkins"
 "Honestly"
 "Glow Worm"
 "Insert Your Name Here"
 "Vanity Skies"
 "Deep Blue Sea"
 "Love Is Going To Save The Day"

References 

American supergroups
American pop music groups
Musical quintets
Musical groups established in 2020
Pop music supergroups